Liolaemus morandae is a species of lizard in the family Iguanidae.  It is found in Argentina.

References

morandae
Lizards of South America
Reptiles of Argentina
Endemic fauna of Argentina
Reptiles described in 2011
Taxa named by Jack W. Sites Jr.